Minneapolis–Saint Paul International Airport , also less commonly known as Wold-Chamberlain Field, is a joint civil-military public-use international airport located in Fort Snelling Unorganized Territory, Minnesota, United States. Although situated within the unorganized territory, the airport is centrally located within  of both downtown Minneapolis and downtown Saint Paul. In addition to primarily hosting commercial flights from major American and some international airlines, the airport is also home to several United States Air Force and Minnesota Air National Guard operations. MSP is the busiest airport in the Upper Midwest.

A joint civil-military airport, MSP is home to the Minneapolis–Saint Paul International Airport Joint Air Reserve Station, supporting both Air Force Reserve Command and Air National Guard flight operations. Units stationed there include the 934th Airlift Wing (934 AW). The airport is located in Fort Snelling Unorganized Territory. Small sections of the airport border the city limits of Minneapolis and Richfield. However, under Minnesota state law, the parcel of land covered by the airport is not part of any city or school district. MSP covers 2,930 acres (1,186 ha) of land. The airport generates an estimated $15.9 billion a year for the Twin Cities' economy and supports 87,000 workers.

MSP was a major hub for Northwest Airlines, and still is for its successor, Delta Air Lines. It also serves as the home airport for Minnesota-based Sun Country Airlines. Delta Air Lines and its regional affiliates account for about 70% of the airport's passenger traffic. The airport is operated by the Metropolitan Airports Commission, which also handles the operation of six smaller airports in the region.

History
What is now known as Minneapolis–Saint Paul International Airport started in 1919 as Speedway Field when several local groups came together to take control of the former bankrupt Twin City Speedway race track. The first hangar was a wooden structure, constructed in 1920 for airmail services. The Minneapolis Park Board took possession of Speedway Field on June 1, 1928, and in 1929, passenger services began.  In 1923, the airport was renamed "Wold–Chamberlain Field" for the World War I pilots Ernest Groves Wold and Cyrus Foss Chamberlain. In 1944 the site was renamed to "Minneapolis–St. Paul Metropolitan Airport/Wold-Chamberlain Field", with "International" replacing "Metropolitan" four years later. Today it is rare to see the Wold–Chamberlain portion of the name used anywhere.

Expansions
Ground was broken for the current Terminal 1 building on October 26, 1958. The US $8.5 million, 600,000 square foot (56,000 m2) terminal with 24 gates on two concourses was designed by Lyle George Landstrom. who worked for Cerny Associates. The terminal, then referred to as the New Terminal, was completed on January 13, 1962, and operations began on January 21. Pier D (formerly the Gold Concourse, now Concourse G) was completed in 1971 and Pier A (formerly the Green Concourse, now Concourse C) was completed in 1972 as part of an expansion of the terminal designed by Cerny Associates. This project also involved rebuilding the existing concourses into bi-level structures equipped with holding rooms and jet bridges. The Gold Concourse was expanded in 1986 and included the airport's first moving walkway. Concourses A and B opened on June 1, 2002, as part of a $250 million terminal expansion designed by Minneapolis-based Architectural Alliance. The final component of the project included a $17.5 million extension of Concourse C consisting of six additional gates, which opened on October 31, 2002.

Terminal 2 was first built in 1986 and then rebuilt in 2001. It is used mostly for charter and low cost airlines, including Minnesota-based Sun Country and Southwest, but is also used for Condor, Icelandair and JetBlue. The terminal has since been expanded and has a total of 14 gates. The colored labeling system for concourses in both terminals was replaced beginning in 2000 with the current system of lettered concourses.

Recent history
Due in part to aircraft noise in south Minneapolis, the Highland Park neighborhood in St. Paul, and surrounding suburbs, proposals were made in the 1990s to build a new airport on the fringes of the Twin Cities metro in Dakota County to handle larger jets and more international traffic. Minneapolis, St. Paul, and other neighboring cities were concerned that such a move would have a negative economic impact, so an arrangement was made where the Metropolitan Airports Commission would outfit many homes in the vicinity of the airport with sound insulation and air conditioning so that indoor noise could be reduced. A citizen group named ROAR (Residents Opposed to Airport Racket) was created in 1998 and helped push the MAC to make these concessions. Later, in 2004, the MAC voted to reduce funding for the soundproofing projects, saying in part that the economic climate had turned in the wake of the September 11 attacks. Minneapolis Mayor R. T. Rybak, who had been a founding member of ROAR, promised that the city would challenge the changes. In 2005, the cities of Minneapolis, Eagan, and Richfield and the Minneapolis Public Housing Authority filed a lawsuit against the MAC, which was settled with a Consent Decree in 2007. The terms in the Consent Decree specified levels of sound insulation for homes within a fixed boundary of projected aircraft noise exposure around MSP. Upon the completion of the noise mitigation program in 2014, more than 15,000 single-family homes and 3,303 multi-family units around MSP were provided noise mitigation at cost of $95 million.

A 2022 J.D. Power survey concluded that with ranking the largest US and Canadian airports on a 1,000 point scale based on traveler satisfaction, the airport received a score of 800, ranking it the best airport in the US and Canada. MSP's high ranking was accredited to its recently-updated facilities.

Facilities

Terminals
Minneapolis–Saint Paul International Airport has two terminals with a total of 131 gates. 

Terminal 1 (Lindbergh) contains 117 gates across seven concourses, lettered A–G.
Terminal 2 (Humphrey) contains 14 gates across one concourse, lettered H.

International arrivals are processed in Concourse G in Terminal 1, and in Terminal 2.

The arrangement can be confusing for some drivers, since no roads directly connect the terminals, meaning that taking the wrong exit can cause a delay of several minutes. In 2010, signage along Highway 5 was updated to make it more clear which airlines serve each terminal.

Terminal 1 is named after aviator Charles Lindbergh, who was raised in Minnesota and Terminal 2 is named after vice president Hubert Humphrey, who represented Minnesota in Congress.

Ground transportation
The terminal buildings are directly located off of Minnesota State Highway 5. Several other major highways that border the airport are Minnesota State Highway 62, Minnesota State Highway 77, and Interstate 494.

Metro Transit, the region's public transportation provider, operates the Blue Line, a light rail route, on the airport grounds. Travelers can use the line to connect between the two terminals. No fare is charged for passengers only travelling between Terminal 1 and 2, and service between the terminals operates all day (the rest of the line shuts down for about four hours overnight). Beyond the airport, the Blue Line travels to downtown Minneapolis and the Mall of America in nearby Bloomington. Metro Transit also operates bus route 54 to Terminal 1.

Military facilities
The Minneapolis–Saint Paul International Airport Joint Air Reserve Station at MSP is home to the 934th Airlift Wing (934 AW), an Air Force Reserve Command (AFRC) unit and the 133d Airlift Wing (133 AW) of the Minnesota Air National Guard. Both units fly the C-130 Hercules and are operationally-gained by the Air Mobility Command (AMC). The 934th consists of over 1,300 military personnel, of which approximately 250 are full-time Active Guard and Reserve (AGR) and Air Reserve Technician (ART) personnel. The 133rd is similarly manned, making for a total military presence of over 2,600 full-time and part-time personnel.

The 934 AW serves as the "host" wing for the installation, which also includes lodging/billeting, officers club, Base Exchange (BX) and other morale, welfare and recreation (MWR) facilities for active, reserve/national guard and retired military personnel and their families.

Runways

Airlines and destinations

Passenger

Cargo

Statistics

Top domestic destinations

Top international destinations

Airline market share

Annual traffic

Accidents and incidents
 On March 7, 1950, Northwest Orient Airlines Flight 307, a Martin 2-0-2 diverted from Rochester International Airport crashed 5 km northwest of MSP after first hitting a 70 foot high flagpole with its left wing on final approach, 8/10 of a mile from the touchdown point, in blinding snow. The left wing eventually detached and the aircraft dived and crashed into a house. All 13 passengers and crew and two children in the house were killed. A loss of visual reference to the ground on approach was the probable cause.
 On January 21, 1985, Galaxy Airlines Flight 203, a Lockheed L-188 Electra 4-engine turboprop, registration N5532, operating as a non-scheduled charter flight from Reno, Nevada to MSP, crashed shortly after takeoff. All but one of the 71 on board died. 
 On May 10, 2005, Northwest Flight 1495, a McDonnell Douglas DC-9, suffered a valve fracture and lost hydraulic pressure in its right engine shortly after takeoff from John Glenn Columbus International Airport en route to MSP. The aircraft performed a successful emergency landing, but began experiencing steering problems and a loss of the brakes while taxing to the gate, resulting in it colliding with the wing of an Airbus A319-114 at approximately 16 mph. Eight injuries were reported among the crew and passengers of both planes and the ground crew.

See also

 Blue Line
 List of airports in Minnesota
 Metro Transit 
 Minneapolis–St. Paul Airport Trams
 Minnesota World War II Army Airfields
 St. Paul Union Depot
 Larry Craig scandal

References

External links

 
  
 MAC Noise Homepage (official—interactive maps of flights and noise data)
 Abandoned & Little-Known Airfields: Minnesota – used for information on former airports
 

 
 Airport diagram for October 1959

 
Airports in Minnesota
Transportation buildings and structures in Hennepin County, Minnesota
1920 establishments in Minnesota
Airports established in 1920